Paula Tsui Siu Fung is a Cantopop singer in Hong Kong, with a career spanning over 50 years. She was affiliated with the TVB television station until the mid-1990s and has performed for Asia Television on several occasions since 1995.

Personal life 
Tsui is the eldest of six children, having three brothers and two sisters. After graduating from secondary school, she worked at her father's salon as a nail technician and hairstylist.

Tsui was born in Hubei, but her family moved to Hong Kong when she was still a baby. She recalls being a mischievous and rebellious child. For example, she only enjoyed music classes, enjoying her natural singing talent but refused to sing the school hymns, instead singing pop songs. She believes this attitude stems from not knowing what she wanted to do, and that makes her memory of youth unclear, she only remembers frequently changing jobs.

The thing that changed her life was a singing contest when Tsui entered one in 1965. Initially, she was reluctant to join the competition, but her friends kept persuading her, and said that they would not participate without Tsui. Then finally, Tsui won that contest came out the champion.
At the same time, Tsui's parents did not approve of her becoming a singer, because they thought musically performing was a shameful career, and that is the reason why Tsui refused to let her family see her performances. However, Tsui promised her family that she would not change her mind and principles. Finally her family agreed with her choice to become a singer. Tsui felt so grateful to her parents reluctance and from it came a promise with her family to become a successful singer. Show business had a lot of temptations and this promise kept a firm focus on her singing.

Tsui is private about her personal life, especially in regards to her romantic life. It was not until the 1990s that was discovered that she had been secretly married to Hong Kong radio host and legislator Albert Cheng between 1975 and 1979. Tsui was then already a renowned singer, while Cheng was still relatively unknown at that time.

Career 

After winning a contest in 1966, she soon began performing. She moved from lounges to nightclubs and then to being a support act for others. Tsui could perform more than 400 songs, and while she did not set out to, she eventually memorised them all. That's why a lot of people think she has personal high standards, but she does not think like that. She considered doing her best was a basic requirement. She rejected the 'famous' label to avoid putting too much pressure on herself. A record executive was in the audience during one of her nightclub performances and offered her a lucrative contract. After signing the contract, Tsui was not allowed to perform in nightclubs again.

Tsui is popularly known for her jaw-dropping gowns on stage. As a result, she is very conscientious in choosing what she wears on stage. If she does not approve of her outfit, she will not show it to anyone. She values the stage effect of her big dresses and will practise moving in them until she feels comfortable with the excess weight. Paradoxically, though she cares about the clothes, she also wants the audiences to focus on her music performance. Even though her stage clothes are all close-fitting, Tsui is not a picky eater; she loves food, and when she faces pressure, she eats chocolates and sweets to release stress.

In recent years, Tsui has reduced her television appearances and other public events. Many have assumed she has retired, but she maintains that she will never retire. In 2016, she had another concert, which completely ditched her elegant and extravagant gowns and costumes.

Concerts 
According to Guinness World Records in 2003, Tsui's Amway Paula Tsui in Concert 1992 holds the record for the most number of "single event" concerts in a continuous period (43 concerts in 37 days) in Asia. She gave another series of concerts at the same venue, the Hong Kong Coliseum in summer 2005.

Tsui is noted for the voluminous gowns she wears for concert appearances. Also, for that reason, she has never worn in-ear monitors in her career. Partly because the technology was not as advanced as it is now, partly because it seemed odd to her elegant image.

Notes

References

External links 
 Paula Tsui fans website (Hong Kong)
 Paula Tsui fans (fan site)
 Chronology of concert performances

  	 

1949 births
Living people
Cantopop singers
Hong Kong film actresses
Hong Kong Mandopop singers
20th-century Hong Kong women singers
Hong Kong television actresses
Hong Kong contraltos
21st-century Hong Kong women singers
20th-century Hong Kong actresses
21st-century Hong Kong actresses